The  Dallas Cowboys season was the franchise's 29th season in the National Football League. The team failed to improve on their 7–8 record from 1987, finishing at 3–13 and missing the playoffs for a third consecutive season. The 3-13 record in the 1988 season was the Cowboys' second worst season to that point in team history, surpassed only by its winless inaugural season in 1960. 

The 1988 season was the final year for head coach Tom Landry, general manager Tex Schramm, and owner Bum Bright. It also featured the rookie season debut of Michael Irvin, one of the franchise's most accomplished players and a Pro Football Hall of Fame inductee.

Offseason

NFL Draft

Game summaries

Week 1

Week 2 at Cardinals

Week 3

Week 4

Week 5

Week 6

Week 7

Week 8

Week 9

Week 10

Week 11

Week 12

Week 13

Week 14

Week 15

Week 16

Summary 
The 1988 season was the last of the Tom Landry era. After the 1988 season, the team would undergo drastic changes including a new head coach, and change of ownership from Bum Bright to current owner Jerry Jones.

Notable additions to the team in 1988 included wide receiver Michael Irvin and linebacker Ken Norton Jr. Defensive tackle Chad Hennings was also drafted in 1988 but, due to his obligations to the U.S. Air Force, he would not join the team until 1992.

The 1988 season was the first time since 1976 that future hall-of-fame running back Tony Dorsett was not on the Dallas roster. Dorsett had been relegated to a backup role to Herschel Walker for most of 1987 and was traded to the Denver Broncos during the offseason.

The 1988 season faced hardship from the release of the schedule. In 1987, Dallas had finished at 7–8, in a 3-way tie for second place in the NFC East and tiebreaking rules gave Dallas the “second place position”, even though Dallas finished fifth (last) in the NFC East in 1987 in “union games” (i.e. a strong replacement team had inflated the Boys’ ‘87 record).

Steve Pelluer had won the starting quarterback job from veteran Danny White late in the 1987 season and won the job in training camp for 1988.  Early in the season, White appeared briefly in relief roles before suffering a season-ending injury in week 7, which elevated Kevin Sweeney to the backup position. Sweeney briefly took over the starting job for Pelluer in weeks 11 and 12, but the results were poor and Pelluer regained the job.

In the season opener, Dallas lost to Pittsburgh, 24–21. The Cowboys had the ball inside the Pittsburgh 10 in the game's closing seconds in position to tie or win the game, but Pelluer was intercepted. After a close win over Phoenix in week two, Dallas lost to the New York Giants, 12–10 (the margin of defeat being a strange safety on the opening kickoff).  A last-second goal line stand brought victory over Atlanta in week four but the following week, the Cowboys lost to New Orleans on a last-second Morten Andersen field goal.  Two convincing losses followed and at 2–5, the season was in jeopardy.

In week 8, Dallas traveled to Philadelphia. Bad blood still existed from 1987, when Philadelphia coach Buddy Ryan, in the game's closing seconds, called a deep pass play when the Eagles were already leading the game by 10 points. The Cowboys roared to a 20–0 lead in the first half, but the Eagles came back to win 24–23 by scoring a touchdown on the game's final play. The next week, Dallas blew a 10–0 second-half lead to lose to the Phoenix Cardinals and fell to 2–7.  The losing streak extended to 10 games before Dallas upset the defending Super Bowl champion Washington Redskins in Week 15 in RFK Stadium, which eliminated the Redskins from 1988 playoff contention. The Redskins win marked the end of an era (and Landry's last win) but was also a harbinger as rookie (and future hall-of-fame) wide receiver Irvin caught three touchdown passes. The team lost the next week at Texas Stadium to the Philadelphia Eagles to finish the season 3–13, the worst record in the entire NFL and the team's worst record since 1960, the Cowboys' first season as an expansion team. A bright spot for the season was Walker, who led the NFC in rushing yards.

In addition to Landry, this was also the final season for long-time Cowboys such as president-general manager Tex Schramm, personnel director Gil Brandt, defensive tackle Randy White, quarterback Danny White, linebacker Mike Hegman, and defensive coordinator Ernie Stautner.

Roster

Regular season

Schedule

Division opponents are in bold text

Standings

Publications
The Football Encyclopedia 
Total Football 
Cowboys Have Always Been My Heroes

References

External links
 1988 Dallas Cowboys
 Pro Football Hall of Fame
 Dallas Cowboys Official Site

Dallas Cowboys seasons
Dallas
Dallas Cowboys